Liverpool Plains Shire was a local government area in the North West Slopes region of New South Wales, Australia.

Liverpool Plains Shire was proclaimed on 7 March 1906, one of 134 shires created after the passing of the Local Government (Shires) Act 1905. 

The shire offices were in Gunnedah and urban centres in the Shire included Breeza, Carroll, Curlewis, Mullaley and Tambar Springs. 

Liverpool Plains Shire amalgamated with the  Municipality of Gunnedah to form Gunnedah Shire on 1 January 1980.

References

Former local government areas of New South Wales
1906 establishments in Australia
1980 disestablishments in Australia